Enhydrocyon is an extinct genus of bone crushing canid which inhabited North America during the Oligocene and Early Miocene, 30.8—20.4 Ma, existing for approximately .

Enhydrocyon dentition suggests this animal was a hypercarnivore or mesocarnivore. Species of Enhydrocyon were relatively large, powerfully built carnivores with a short snout and deep jaws reminiscent of a jaguar. These features give the skull a shape resembling that of the extant sea otter (Enhydra), prompting the scientific name.

Species
†Enhydrocyon basilatus Cope 1879
†E. crassidens Matthew 1907
†E. pahinsintewakpa Macdonald 1963
†E. sectorius Cope 1883
†E. stenocephalus Cope 1879

References

Hesperocyonines
Oligocene canids
Miocene canids
Aquitanian genus extinctions
White River Fauna
Prehistoric carnivoran genera
Rupelian genus first appearances
Taxa named by Edward Drinker Cope